Sierra de Baza is a mountain range near the city of Baza in the Granada province in Spain. It is named after the town of Baza and its highest point is the 2,269 m high Calar de Santa Bárbara.

It is located between the Sierra Nevada and the Sierra de Cazorla and Sierra de Segura mountain ranges. It merges towards the east with the Sierra de los Filabres mountain range.

See also
Hoya of Baza

References

External links 

 Parque Natural de la Sierra de Baza
 Sierra de Baza Site

Baza
Baza